Dimitri Valeryevich Lykin (born March 13, 1974) is a Russian sport shooter, specializing in the running targets event. He won the bronze medal at the 2004 Olympic Games in the 10 m Running Target event. He also competed at 1996 and 2000 Olympic Games.

Olympic results

Records

External links
Profile on issfnews.com

1974 births
Living people
Sportspeople from Omsk
Russian male sport shooters
Running target shooters
Olympic shooters of Russia
Shooters at the 1996 Summer Olympics
Shooters at the 2000 Summer Olympics
Shooters at the 2004 Summer Olympics
Olympic bronze medalists for Russia
Olympic medalists in shooting
Medalists at the 2004 Summer Olympics